Uranium trifluoride is an inorganic chemical compound with the chemical formula UF3.

Synthesis
Uranium trifluoride can be obtained by reacting uranium(IV) fluoride with aluminium at 900 °C or with uranium:

References

Uranium(III) compounds
Fluorides
Actinide halides